Joseph Enrique Uichico (born July 15, 1962), better known as Jong Uichico, is a Filipino professional basketball coach who last coached the Bataan Risers in the Maharlika Pilipinas Basketball League. Uichico is a former Philippine national team Youth member and a former player and head coach of the La Salle Green Archers in the UAAP before replacing Ron Jacobs as SMB coach in 1999. Uichico was coach of the San Miguel Beermen from 1999–2006, leading the Beermen to six PBA championships.

Basketball career
Uichico played for the La Salle Green Archers in the collegiate ranks. He was a member of the 1982 RP Youth Team that won the ABC Under-18 Championship. After a stint with the famed Northern Consolidated Cement squad of Ron Jacobs, Uichico ended his basketball career early.

Coaching career

Early years 
In the mid-1990s, Uichico had a coaching stint with the Green Archers and guided them to two runner-up trophies. He also joined the Magnolia Beverage Masters coaching staff during Norman Black and Jacobs tenure. In 1999, Uichico became the new head coach of the Beermen after Jacobs' departure.

San Miguel Beermen 
After an early elimination in the All-Filipino Cup, he coached the Beermen to the Commissioner and Governors Cup titles during the 1999 campaign, ending San Miguel's five-year title drought. He is also the first rookie coach to lead his team to back-to-back titles in the same year, a feat duplicated by Siot Tanquingcen in 2005.

In 2000, Uichico once again guided San Miguel to two more titles and laid claim to his first and only Coach of the Year plum. His first All-Filipino Cup title with the Beermen came in 2001, defeating sister team Barangay Ginebra Kings.

He returned as San Miguel's head coach after the Asian Games campaign, but went on a four-year title drought before winning his sixth PBA title in six years in the 2005 Fiesta Conference. The Beermen defeated the Talk 'N Text Phone Pals, 4–1.

Barangay Ginebra

On August 3, 2006, Chot Reyes was named as the new head coach of the San Miguel Beermen replacing Uichico and the San Miguel Corporation moved Uichico to San Miguel's sister team the Barangay Ginebra Kings replacing Siot Tanquingcen, who was demoted as one of Uichico's assistants. On his first Ginebra coaching stint, he was able to win a championship in the 2006–07 PBA Philippine Cup that season. A year later, he won his 2nd championship with the Gin Kings in the 2008 PBA Fiesta Conference and his 8th overall title.

In 2012, he left Ginebra to coach the Smart Gilas National Team.

Talk 'N Text
On July 9, 2014, The MVP group shuffled the coaches of Meralco Bolts, NLEX Road Warriors and Talk 'N Text Tropang Texters and as a result Norman Black would be the head coach of Meralco Bolts and Uichico would replace him as the new head coach of Talk 'N Text Tropang Texters.

On April 29, 2015, Uichico got his ninth championship with the Tropang Texters after defeating the Rain or Shine Elasto Painters in seven games.

Philippines at the 2017 Southeast Asian Games
Uichico led the Philippine national team that will participate at the 2017 Southeast Asian Games instead of the Chot Reyes, who will be leading the Philippine squad which will compete at the 2017 FIBA Asia Cup due to an overlapping schedule between the two competitions.

List of PBA championships
 9× PBA champion, 14× Finals Appearances
 San Miguel Franchise (6):
1999 Commissioner's 
1999 Governors' 
2000 Commissioner's
2000 Governors' 
2001 All-Filipino 
2005 Fiesta 
 Ginebra Franchise (2):
2006-07 Philippine
2008 Fiesta
 Talk 'N Text Franchise (1):
2015 Commissioner's

National Team 
 
Ron Jacobs appointed Uichico as one of his assistants for the RP team's 2002 Asian Games campaign. However, after Jacobs suffered a stroke, Uichico was named as the new head coach of the national squad. Uichico guided the Philippines to a fourth-place finish in the event. Their semifinal loss against eventual tournament winner South Korea was a crushing blow for Uichico's squad losing by one point on a Lee Sang Min triple in the final seconds. Despite the loss, the team still brought home what is known to Filipino basketball fans as "The Silent Gold."

He returned in 2013 as an assistant coach for national team and helped the team to win two silver medals in 2013 and 2015 FIBA Asia Championships. 

But in 2017, Uichico was slapped a three-game suspension after he was caught on video joining a mob that attacked an already fallen Chris Goulding of Australian team in 2019 FIBA World Cup Asian qualifiers game at the Philippine Arena.

Coaching record

Collegiate record

References

External links
PBA Website

1962 births
Living people
Filipino men's basketball coaches
Filipino men's basketball players
San Miguel Beermen coaches
Philippines men's national basketball team players
Philippines men's national basketball team coaches
Basketball players from Manila
De La Salle Green Archers basketball players
De La Salle Green Archers basketball coaches
Barangay Ginebra San Miguel coaches
TNT Tropang Giga coaches